Masterkova may refer to the following people.

Svetlana Masterkova (b. 1968), a former Russian middle-distance runner, an Olympic champion.
 Lidia Masterkova (Lydia, Lidiya) (1927-2008), important Russian Artist Painter